Montigny-lès-Metz (literally Montigny near Metz; , (1940-1944) Montenich) is a commune in the Moselle department in Grand Est in north-eastern France.

It is the largest suburb of the city of Metz, and is adjacent to it on the west.

Population

Points of interest
 Jardin botanique de Metz

See also
 Communes of the Moselle department

References

External links

 Official website 

Montignylesmetz